White Horse Beach is a village of Plymouth, Massachusetts, United States. It is located on Cape Cod Bay, south of Priscilla Beach. Much of the southern end of the beach, which is also known as Taylor Avenue Beach, south of the outflow of Bartlett Pond, either has cottages on it or has a fenced off conservation area to protect the dunes and fragile plant life.

At the north end of the beach is a rock sticking out of the water with an American flag painted on. According to local lore, this act of patriotism was performed to cover a Nazi swastika painted on the rock. In the summer of 1941 local teenagers painted the first flag and went on to join the armed forces after Pearl Harbor was bombed in December 1941.  The harsh winter storms washed the flag thin so the swastika showed through.  The next Fourth of July the tradition of re-painting the flag was born.  Ed Fitzgerald, a White Horse resident, was part of that group.  When Ed was of age he also joined the military service and left the tradition to his cousins, the Bradley boys of Priscilla Beach.  For years they maintained the flag each Fourth of July until 1985 when family home was sold.

There is a small business district just beyond the north end of the beach. It has a general store and a Post Office. Its ZIP code is 02381. Residents and businesses in this village that are non-Post Office box holders use Plymouth's ZIP code of 02360.
Further inland are St. Catherine's Church (which has now been closed,  razed, the property has been planted with grass and trees and serves as a small park.) White Horse Cemetery, which dates back to the early 18th century. The Post Office was built in the former White Horse Bowling Alley that included pool tables, and pinball machines. Pin setting was done manually by "Pin Spotters" who had to move fast to keep up with the Bowlers. Two hotels were located on White Horse Beach, the Mayflower and the White Horse Hotel. The Mayflower has since burned and the area developed into Condos. White Horse Hotel was torn down in the sixties to make way for a parking lot.

Annual activities 
White Horse Beach is widely known for its Independence Day celebrations, which are held on July 3 annually. This early celebration of Independence Day extends back to the 1800s, when residents burned scrap and driftwood on the beach. Tradition would dictate that these bonfires be extinguished by the rising tide. Depending on the phase of the moon, festivities would go late into the evening. In recent years, the town fire department has begun to request permits for bonfires (non-permitted bonfires are sometimes removed by the fire department). Historically, town officials have requested that these fires be extinguished no earlier than midnight. Also in recent years, the celebrations have experienced a soft "crackdown by police and fire departments" to deter the historically massive bonfires and fireworks; "NO Public Parking or Restroom Facilities" are officially advertised on location for this event to deter non-residents from attending, however despite changing times, the beachfront residents continue to welcome party-goers with open arms.

Landmarks and recreation 
White Horse Beach is also home to the Priscilla Beach Theatre, a professional center for drama education and performance. It is also the location of Bartlett Pond, which is a shallow eutrophic pond located behind White Horse Beach. This pond is fed by Beaver Dam Brook and its outlet flows into Cape Cod Bay. White Horse was known as part of the "Irish Riviera" due to the large population of Dorchester, Somerville, and South Boston Irish who would vacation there in the 1940s, 50s, and 60s. It was the typical summer colony that one would find on the South Shore and Cape Cod. Many cottages from that era still stand to this day, though some have been destroyed by storms and some have been renovated to depart from their original style.

White Horse Beach landmarks include:

 Coast Guard Station, a former United States Coast Guard station which although no longer there has a stone memorial to deceased surfmen
 White Horse General Store
 White Horse Rock

See also
 Neighborhoods in Plymouth, Massachusetts
 Priscilla Beach

Notes

External links
 White Horse Beach

Villages in Plymouth, Massachusetts
Beaches of Massachusetts
Landforms of Plymouth County, Massachusetts
Tourist attractions in Plymouth County, Massachusetts
Villages in Massachusetts